Alfons Marti, or Alfons Marti Bauza, is a Spanish writer,  born in Palma de Mallorca (Balearic Islands) on 8 February 1968. He has written essays, a philosophical novel and travel books, amongst other works.

References

1968 births
Living people
People from Palma de Mallorca
Spanish essayists
Spanish novelists
Spanish male novelists
Male essayists